Tak Dam (also Romanized as Tak Dām; also known as Jahādābād) is a village in Meshgin-e Sharqi Rural District, in the Central District of Meshgin Shahr County, Ardabil Province, Iran. At the 2006 census, its population was 304, in 80 families.

References 

Towns and villages in Meshgin Shahr County